Christmas Holiday is a 1944 American film noir crime film directed by Robert Siodmak and starring Deanna Durbin and Gene Kelly. Based on the 1939 novel of the same name by W. Somerset Maugham, the film is about a woman who marries a Southern aristocrat who inherited his family's streak of violence and instability and soon drags the woman into a life of misery. After he is arrested, the woman runs away from her husband's family, changes her name, and finds work as a singer in a New Orleans dive. The film received an Academy Award nomination for Best Musical Score for Hans J. Salter.

Plot
On Christmas Eve in New Orleans, U.S. Army officer Charlie Mason meets beautiful Maison Lafitte hostess "Jackie" (whose real name is Abigail Manette). She tells him, in flashbacks, the story of the decline of her marriage with the charming but unbalanced Robert Manette. When her husband kills a bookie, his controlling mother tries to cover it up. When he is caught, she and her son blame Abigail. Abigail, feeling guilty when her husband receives a life sentence, becomes a bar hostess. Meanwhile, Robert escapes from jail and comes to see Abigail, but he is shot by police and dies in her arms, leaving her to start again.

Cast
 Deanna Durbin as Jackie Lamont / Abigail Martin
 Gene Kelly as Robert Manette
 Richard Whorf as Simon Fenimore
 Dean Harens as Lieutenant Charlie Mason
 Gladys George as Valerie De Merode
 Gale Sondergaard as Mrs. Manette
 David Bruce as Gerald Tyler

Production

Novel
The film was based on a novel by W. Somerset Maugham published in 1939. The New York Times called the novel "surprisingly talky."

The book became a best seller. By the end of the year it had sold over 100,000 copies in America.

Walter Wanger wanted to turn it into a film in 1939, but the Hays Office rejected his proposal as they felt the novel's story about an Englishman meeting a beautiful Russian prostitute was too sordid.

Deanna Durbin
In March 1943 Universal bought the screen rights to the book as a vehicle for Deanna Durbin. The movie was part of a specific plan by producer Felix Jackson to broaden the sort of films Durbin was making - it would be followed by her first color film, Caroline, then a mystery, Lady on a Train, then a film with Charles Boyer.

Durbin, usually the girl next door in Universal Pictures musicals, plays a naif who falls for him and sticks with him even knowing he's a killer. Christmas Holiday was the first film Durbin starred in that had not been specifically written for her.

In August 1943 Durbin called the movie "my dramatic debut." She would only sing two numbers. "Deanna did always have sex appeal" said Jackson. "I don't believe a star can be a star without it. Of course each of us has a different opinion on the matter."

Screenwriter Herman J. Mankiewicz changed the setting from a Paris brothel to a nightclub in New Orleans and the main character was changed from a prostitute to a more ambiguous nightclub singer and hostess.

Mankiewicz was fired while writing the screenplay when Universal executives saw him drunk on the studio lot. A week later the writer walked into Jackson's office and said "Felix, don't you think Herman Mankiewicz drunk is still better than Dwight Taylor sober?" Jackson rehired him.  Mankiewicz considered the screenplay among his 1940s successes of which he was most proud.

Universal loaned Turhan Bey to MGM in exchange for Gene Kelly who played her husband. Kelly was signed in October 1943. Dean Harens who had been a success on Broadway signed to make his feature film debut. Gale Sondegaard joined the film in November.

The director was Robert Siodmak who said the film had "a good plot (though the studio always wanted to change my psychological endings into physical ones, when the Hays office didn't intervene...) and interesting casting Gene Kelly in such a way as to suggest a sinister quality behind a rather superficial charm."

Shooting
Filming started November 15, 1943 and finished on February 12, 1944.

Siodmark said Durbin "is a real actress. For five days she had to cry and for five days she cried and cried. But each day at 4 pm sharp and would cry no more. It was amazing. That is a real actress for you."

Siodmak later said Durbin "was difficult: she wanted to play a new part but flinched from looking like a tramp: she always wanted to look like nice wholesome Deanna Durbin pretending to be a tramp. Still, the result was quite effective."

Durbin said during filming "I'll be satisfied if they come out saying I gave a good performance."

In February 1944, Universal signed Durbin to a new exclusive six-year contract.

Soundtrack
Durbin performs two musical numbers in Christmas Holiday: "Spring Will Be a Little Late This Year" written for the film by Frank Loesser, and also the Irving Berlin ballad "Always". The film also features excerpts from Tristan und Isolde ("Liebestod") by Richard Wagner, "Silent Night, Holy Night" by Franz Xaver Gruber, and Latin chant for the Midnight Mass scene (which was footage of an actual Tridentine Mass at the Cathedral of Saint Vibiana).

Critical response

Contemporaneous
The film received mixed reviews. In his review for The New York Times, Bosley Crowther called the story "the oldest sort of hat—the kind of dramatic farrago that was being played by faded stars ten years ago." Crowther wrote that it was "really grotesque and outlandish what they've done to Miss Durbin in this film"—forced to play a role that is "a figment within a moody and hackneyed yarn." Crowther criticized Mankiewicz' screenplay, which has "but the vaguest resemblance to the Somerset Maugham novel on which it is 'based'". Although not blaming Durbin for the film's shortcomings, Crowther is severe in his criticism of her performance:

Crowther is no more charitable towards Gene Kelly, who "performs her no good husband in his breezy, attractive style, which is thoroughly confusing, considering the character that he is supposed to be."

Modern
The film has received generally positive reviews from modern day critics. The review aggregator Rotten Tomatoes reports that 78% of critics gave the film a positive review based on 9 reviews.

J. Hoberman of Tablet gave the film a glowing review saying "Christmas Holiday is one of the most Teutonic of Hollywood movies—a heritage borne out by its moody lighting, expressionist compositions, a soupçon of Krafft-Ebing, and long excerpts from Wagner's “Liebestod.”"

Legacy
Durbin later said in an interview with Films in Review that Christmas Holiday was her "only really good film". Christmas Holiday is considered one of the bleakest films noir of the 1940s, and one of Siodmak's most personally realized films.

Box-office
By July 1944 the film had made more than $2 million at the US box office, making it the highest-grossing film of Durbin's career so far. It was also Universal's most successful film of the year overtaking Arabian Nights which made $1.7 million. Universal said the average gross of a Durbin film was $1,250,000.

"Oddly enough it did very well," said Siodmak. "I suppose everyone was so interested to see what Deanna Durbin would be like in a dramatic role. However she never tried again."

See also
List of American films of 1944

References

External links
 
 
 
 

1944 films
1944 crime drama films
American Christmas drama films
American black-and-white films
1940s English-language films
Film noir
Films based on works by W. Somerset Maugham
Films directed by Robert Siodmak
Films based on British novels
Films set in New Orleans
Films with screenplays by Herman J. Mankiewicz
Universal Pictures films
1940s Christmas drama films
American crime drama films
Films scored by Hans J. Salter
1940s American films